Between 1897 and 1902, the French filmmaker Georges Méliès (1861–1938) made numerous actualités reconstituées ("reconstructed actualities" or "reconstructed newsreels"). Unlike conventional actuality films, which presented real-life events or simple naturalistic scenes filmed in a documentary style, these reconstructed actualities were dramatically staged reenactments of current events, employing miniature models and theatrical techniques. Méliès particularly focused on capturing the spectacular nature of the events he recreated. While little is known of the exact release dates for many of Méliès's films, it appears that the reconstructed actualities were offered for sale soon after the events they portrayed, when the news was still fresh in viewers' minds.

These reconstructed actualities are part of a wider tradition of "faked" news film, a genre very popular in the early years of cinema. Between 1894 and 1900, every major film studio regularly produced reenactments of current events. Some of these films were deliberate hoaxes, intended to be misconstrued as actual footage of the events they portrayed; others were made with no intention to mislead audiences, and were designed simply as illustrations of the events. In the case of Méliès, the reconstructed actualities were deliberately described as reenactments, and were not intended to be misconstrued as real. However, contemporary accounts suggest that some viewers assumed the films were genuine, and a few exhibitors even advertised the films falsely as such. After a sustained period of popularity, the genre fell out of favor in the 1910s, apparently due to growing public distaste for artificiality in film reportage.

Méliès's reconstructed actualities have been described as an early form of docudrama. They can also be compared to the newspaper and magazine engravings of Méliès's time, many of which made a similar attempt to capture the essence of a news event rather than to simulate it realistically.

Films

The following annotated list collects the Méliès films identified by scholars as reconstructed actualities. The list includes the numbers assigned to them in the catalogues of Méliès's studio, the Star Film Company; the original French and English titles; the date of release; and whether the film survives or is presumed lost. Unless otherwise referenced, these data are derived from research published in 2008 by Jacques Malthête and Laurent Mannoni.

Greco-Turkish War

In the 1890s, about two-thirds of Greek people lived in lands controlled by Turkey (i.e., the Ottoman Empire), such as the Greek island of Crete. Greek uprisings had occurred sporadically within the Empire from the 1860s onward; massacres occurred on both sides. On 10 February 1897, a group of Greeks on Crete were killed in a massacre led by Turks. Numerous European powers intervened, and war between Greece and Turkey was declared on 18 April. The Greco-Turkish War ended when the involved European forces, not wanting Greece to be annexed by Turkey, arranged an armistice on 18 May.

The Greco-Turkish War was the first military conflict to be captured on motion-picture film, as well as the first one to be recreated for the cinema with staged reconstructions. One contemporary reviewer described Méliès's Greco-Turkish War films as "wonderfully realistic and extremely popular" thanks to "good scene-painting and realistic actors."

Revolts in India
In June–August 1897, on the northwestern frontier of India, Indians revolted against British colonists. Méliès made two films about the revolts.

Spanish–American War

The Spanish–American War broke out when, after the explosion and sinking of the USS Maine in Havana Harbor on 15 February 1898, the United States intervened in the Cuban War of Independence. The Spanish navy was defeated in the Battle of Santiago de Cuba and the Battle of Manila Bay, and the Treaty of Paris on 10 December 1898 signaled the end of the Spanish Empire.

Méliès's films about the war, produced to a more ambitious standard than his Greco-Turkish reconstructions had been, cover the sinking of the Maine as well as the ensuing conflict between Spain and the United States. According to an announcement published on 1 May 1898, these films were presented at Méliès's theatre of illusions in Paris, the Théâtre de Robert-Houdin.

The Dreyfus Affair

During or shortly after the trial of Alfred Dreyfus in Rennes, Méliès made a series of eleven short films about the Dreyfus affair. The series remains the most famous of Méliès's works in the reconstructed actuality genre, and the film historian Georges Sadoul described it as the first "politically engaged" work in cinema history. See the main article for more information.

Final reconstructed actualities
In 1902, Méliès made three final works in the reconstructed actuality genre: The Eruption of Mount Pelee, The Catastrophe of the Balloon "Le Pax", and his most complex reconstruction, The Coronation of Edward VII.

Notes

Footnotes

References

Citations

External links

Films directed by Georges Méliès